The firehose of falsehood is a propaganda technique in which a large number of messages are broadcast rapidly, repetitively, and continuously over multiple channels (such as news and social media) without regard for truth or consistency. An outgrowth of Soviet propaganda techniques, the firehose of falsehood is a contemporary model for Russian propaganda under Russian President Vladimir Putin.

The Russian government used the technique during its offensive against Georgia in 2008, and continued to use it in Russia's war with Ukraine, including its successful use in 2014 during the annexation of Crimea, and attempting to use it during the prelude to the 2022 invasion of Ukraine. The model has been adopted by other governments and political movements around the world, including by former U.S. President Donald Trump.

Characteristics 
The modern application of the technique is distinguished from the Soviet propaganda techniques used during the Cold War by the much larger number of messages and channels used in the internet age and the "shameless" approach to disseminating falsehoods and contradictory messages. The immediate aim is to entertain, confuse, and overwhelm the audience. The "firehose" takes advantage of modern technology, such as the Internet and social media, as well as recent changes in how people produce and consume news. 

According to a 2016 RAND Corporation study, the firehose of falsehood model has four distinguishing factors: it (1) is high-volume and multichannel, (2) is rapid, continuous, and repetitive, (3) lacks a commitment to objective reality; and (4) lacks commitment to consistency.  The high volume of messages, the use of multiple channels, and the use of internet bots and fake accounts are effective because people are more likely to believe a story when it appears to have been reported by multiple sources. In addition to the recognizably-Russian news source, RT, for example, Russia disseminates propaganda using dozens of proxy websites, whose connection to RT is "disguised or downplayed." People are also more likely to believe a story when they think many others believe it, especially if those others belong to a group with which they identify. Thus, an army of trolls can influence a person's opinion by creating the false impression that a majority of that person's neighbors support a given view.

The Russian government's use of the technique had some success in getting people to believe and spread falsehoods and disbelieve truthful reporting. The approach's success flouts the conventional wisdom that communication is more persuasive when it is truthful, credible, and non-contradictory. 

Although the firehosing technique takes advantage of modern technology, it is informed by the thinking of the Russian revolutionary Vladimir Lenin, according to the literary critic Michiko Kakutani. In 1907, before a party tribunal convened to examine his uncomradely accusations against fellow party members, Lenin admitted he could have characterised their actions with greater accuracy. He explained in his defence, however, that his heated language was "calculated not to convince, but to break up the ranks of the opponent, not to correct the mistake of the opponent, but to destroy him, to wipe his organization off the face of the earth." In his biography of Lenin, the historian Victor Sebestyen described him as the "godfather" of "post-truth politics."  

Kakutani also cites Vladislav Surkov, a Russian businessman and propagandist. Surkov helped engineer Vladimir Putin's rise to power by sowing chaos and confusion and has suggested that the United States is also looking for a "strong hand" to lift it from increasing chaos.

Campaigns 
The Russian government has used the "firehose of falsehood" at least as early as its offensive against Georgia in 2008. The Russian government has continued to use this propaganda technique as part of its disinformation campaigns targeting the "near abroad" post-Soviet states, including Ukraine, and the three Baltic states of Lithuania, Latvia, and Estonia, as well as the United States (including as part of its interference in the 2016 United States elections) and Western Europe. 

Russia also deployed the technique as part of its involvement in the Syrian civil war. For example, in November 2017, Russian state media published a number of stories claiming that coalition forces were purposely allowing Islamic State fighters to escape from Abu Kamal, Syria. The stories included a so-called "satellite image", which was later found to be a screen capture from a video game. In 2019, according to the science writer William J. Broad of The New York Times, Russia, working through its state  propaganda network RT America, began a "firehose of falsehood" campaign to convince Americans that 5G phones were a health hazard, even as Putin was ordering the launch of 5G networks in Russia. 

According to the author and former military intelligence officer John Loftus, Iran has been using similar methods to incite hatred against Saudi Arabia, the United States, and Israel. He claims that some fake news that is attributed to Russia was actually planted in the Western press by Iran.

During Indonesia's 2019 presidential race, the incumbent, Joko Widodo, accused Prabowo Subianto's campaign team of disseminating hateful propaganda aided by foreign consultants and cited "Russian propaganda" and the "firehose of falsehood" model.

According to the Mother Jones, editor Monika Bauerlein, the firehose technique is increasingly being used against the press by American politicians. She warns readers to expect an increase in the use of several related tactics: the lawsuit threat, the "fake news" denial, and the ad hominem attack. Deepfake video also poses a serious threat, according to the Belgian journalist , who warns that "we've only seen the beginning of fake news."

The firehosing technique has been successfully used by the anti-vaccine movement to spread debunked theories about the supposed dangers of vaccination.

Countermeasures 

Conventional counterpropaganda efforts are ineffective against this technique. As researchers at RAND put it, "Don't expect to counter the firehose of falsehood with the squirt gun of truth." They suggest:

 repeating the counterinformation
 providing an alternative story to fill in the gaps created when false "facts" are removed
 forewarning people about propaganda, highlighting the ways propagandists manipulate public opinion
 countering the effects of propaganda, rather than the propaganda itself; for example, to counter propaganda that undermines support for a cause, work to boost support for that cause rather than refuting the propaganda directly
 turning off the flow by enlisting the aid of Internet service providers and social media services, and conducting electronic warfare and cyberspace operations

Researchers at the German Marshall Fund suggest, among other things, being careful not to repeat or amplify the original false claim; repeating a false story, even to refute it, makes people more likely to believe it. Security expert Bruce Schneier recommends teaching digital literacy as part of an 8-step information operations kill chain.

Another way to combat disinformation is to respond quickly as events unfold and be the first to tell the story. An example of this occurred in February 2018, when Syrian pro-regime forces began shelling Syrian Democratic Forces near Khasham and coalition forces responded in self-defense. The Combined Joint Task Force – Operation Inherent Resolve (CJTF-OIR) immediately published a news release titled "Unprovoked attack by Syrian pro-regime forces prompts coalition defensive strikes." In response to the news, reporters from around the world flooded the CJTF–OIR with queries, which allowed CJTF–OIR to establish the facts before Russian news outlets could spin the story.

In "How We Win the Competition for Influence" (2019), military strategists Wilson C. Blythe and Luke T. Calhoun stress the importance of consistent messaging. They compare information operations to other weapons used by the military to target an enemy and achieve a desired result: "The information environment is an inherent part of today's battlefields."

See also 
 Big lie
 Gaslighting
 Gish gallop
 Illusory truth effect
 Information warfare
 Post-truth politics
 Propaganda techniques
 Russian propaganda
 Spreading (debate)

References

External links 
 Why obvious lies make great propaganda, Vox, 31 August 2018

Propaganda techniques
Propaganda in Russia